ITV Studios Australia is an Australian television production company and the Australian arm of UK company ITV Studios. It was formed as Artist Services in 1989, later becoming Granada Media Australia before being rebranded to its current name in 2013.

The company produces or co-produces numerous Australian television programs across commercial television, public broadcasters and subscription television in Australia. ITV Studios Australia is based at Fox Studios Australia in Sydney.

History
The company has its origins in production company Artist Services, a company formed in 1989 by a group of investors including Steve Vizard, producing many shows such as Fast Forward, Full Frontal, SeaChange and Tonight Live with Steve Vizard. Half of the company was sold to John Fairfax Holdings in 1995 for 9 million, at a time when the company was generating about $50 million per year. In 1998, the entire company was acquired by Granada for 25 million.

Under the Granada Media Australia banner, the company produced a variety of programs including the first seven seasons of the Seven Network's Dancing with the Stars (2004–2007); Nine Network's Merrick & Rosso Unplanned (2003); six seasons of Fox8's Australia's Next Top Model; Ten's Australian Princess (2005–2007), Talkin' 'Bout Your Generation (2009–2012, 2018–2019) and reboot of Young Talent Time (2012); Lifestyle Channel's Come Dine with Me Australia. 

The company rebranded as ITV Studios Australia in January 2013, with the first program carrying the new branding being the second season of ABC comedy program Shaun Micallef's Mad as Hell.

Under the ITV Studios name, productions include LifeStyle Channel's Paddock to Plate (2013–2014), Seven game show The Chase Australia (2015–present), Ten's I'm a Celebrity...Get Me Out of Here! (2015–present) and the sixth season of Nine's The Voice Australia (2017–present).

Productions
 Programs with a shaded background indicate the program is still in production.

References

External links

Mass media companies established in 1989
Australian companies established in 1989
Companies based in Sydney
Fairfax Media
ITV (TV network)
Television production companies of Australia
Australian subsidiaries of foreign companies